= Udai Lal Kumhar =

Indian sculptor

UDai Lal Kumhar (1949–2007) was an award-winning potter from Rajasthan who worked in terracotta. He lived in a small village near Udaipur. He won the Rajasthan State Award for Master Craftsmen 1985-1986 for terracotta.
